Aplectana is a genus of nematodes. It includes, among other species, Aplectana herediaensis.

References 

Cosmocercidae
Rhabditida genera